The following are the records of Turkey in Olympic weightlifting. Records are maintained in each weight class for the snatch lift, clean and jerk lift, and the total for both lifts by the Turkish Weightlifting Federation (Türkiye Halter Federasyonu).

Current records
Key to tables:

Men

Women

Historical records

Men (1998–2018)

Women (1998–2018)

Notes

References
General
Turkish records 14 August 2022 updated
Specific

External links
Turkish Weightlifting Federation official website

records
Turkey
Olympic weightlifting
weightlifting